Nakamun Park is a summer village in Alberta, Canada. It is located on the southern shore of Nakamun Lake, west of Highway 33 and north of Onoway.

Demographics 

In the 2016 Census of Population conducted by Statistics Canada, the Summer Village of Nakamun Park had a population of 96 living in 45 of its 148 total private dwellings, a  change from its 2011 population of 36.

See also 
List of communities in Alberta
List of summer villages in Alberta
List of resort villages in Saskatchewan

References

External links 

1966 establishments in Alberta
Lac Ste. Anne County
Summer villages in Alberta